The 1993 Swedish Open was a men's tennis tournament played on outdoor clay courts in Båstad, Sweden that was part of the World Series of the 1993 ATP Tour. It was the 46th edition of the tournament and was held from 5 July until 11 July 1993. Unseeded Horst Skoff won the singles title.

Finals

Singles

 Horst Skoff defeated  Ronald Agénor, 7–5, 1–6, 6–0
 It was Skoff's 1st singles title of the year and the 4th of his career.

Doubles

 Henrik Holm /  Anders Järryd defeated  Brian Devening /  Tomas Nydahl, 6–1, 3–6, 6–3

References

External links
 ITF tournament edition details